Dalekie may refer to the following places in Poland:
Dalekie, Grodzisk Wielkopolski County in Greater Poland Voivodeship (west-central Poland)
Dalekie, Poznań County in Greater Poland Voivodeship (west-central Poland)
Dalekie, Ostrów Mazowiecka County in Masovian Voivodeship (east-central Poland)
Dalekie, Wyszków County in Masovian Voivodeship (east-central Poland)
Dalekie, Świętokrzyskie Voivodeship (south-central Poland)
Dalekie, Pomeranian Voivodeship (north Poland)